The rainbow wave was a phrase coined during the 2018 U.S. Midterm Elections, describing the unparalleled number of openly LGBTQ+ candidates now running for political office in the United States.

The Rainbow Wave began during the 2018 Midterms when over 400 LGBTQ+ candidates ran for office and, according to the LGBTQ+ Victory Fund, a record-breaking 161 were elected.

In the 2020 U.S. Election’s rainbow wave, over 1,000 LGBTQ+ people ran for office and 334 won out of 734 LGBTQ+ candidates in the general election. However, according to Princeton professor and LGBTQ+ politics researcher Andrew Reynolds in an interview with Insider, the election was more like a “splash” rather than a wave, as the election results aligned with the ongoing trend of increasing LGBTQ+ elects in “slow increments.”

The 2022 U.S. Midterm Elections represented another rainbow wave, as 714 LGBTQ+ individuals ran for office, with candidates from all 50 states for the first time in history, and, according to the LGBTQ+ Victory Fund, 436 won.

References 

LGBT politics in the United States